In the United States, the farm bill is the primary agricultural and food policy instrument of the federal government.  Every five years, Congress deals with the renewal and revision of the comprehensive omnibus bill. 

Congress makes amendments to provisions of permanent law, reauthorizes, amends, or repeals provisions of preceding temporary agricultural acts, and puts forth new policy provisions for a limited time into the future.  Beginning in 1933, farm bills have included sections ("titles") on commodity programs, trade, rural development, farm credit, conservation, agricultural research, food and nutrition programs, marketing, etc.

Some provisions are highly controversial. Provisions can impact international trade, the environment, the food supply, food safety, and the economies of rural America. Powerful interest groups are poised to intervene, including organizations of farmers (such as the American Farm Bureau Federation), as well as big agribusiness corporations (such as John Deere, Cargill, Pioneer Hi Bred International, and Monsanto). Congress is polarized along lines of ideology and interest groups. Republicans are more conservative, represent rural areas, and are tied to agricultural and businesses groups while Democrats are more liberal and tied to environmentalists, cities, and labor unions.  Critics sometimes warn against putting together the agricultural and nutrition parts. However, doing so helps to bridge some of the politically relevant cultural differences that exist between legislators of urban and rural, coastal and heartland areas of the country. Traditionally, the agriculture programs have been more important for rural areas of the heartland, while urban and coastal regions have been more concerned with the nutrition assistance programs. There are stakeholders outside of the government that are also interested in food and agriculture issues. These include national farm groups, commodity associations, state organizations, nutrition and public health officials, advocacy groups representing conservation, recreation, rural development, faith-based interests, local food systems, and organic production. Putting nutrition and agriculture topics together allows for stakeholders and advocacy coalitions with different interests to find common ground on topics that are potentially contentious between them.

Some of the programs that are authorized in a farm bill fall into the spending category of mandatory, while others are discretionary. Programs with mandatory funding have their funds authorized directly within the farm bill. On the other hand, programs with discretionary funding require for congressional appropriators to designate funding to them because they are not funded directly in the farm bill. Cost projections for funding estimates are calculated by the Congressional Budget Office using a baseline, which is an estimate of future costs over 10 years if the existing costs were to continue unchanged. Adjustments to funding levels between programs generally occurs from one year to the next, incrementally.

On May 18, 2018 the $867 billion 2018 United States farm bill failed in the House of Representatives with a vote of 198 yea to 213 nay. All Democrats and 30 Republicans voted against the measure.  Republican opposition came largely from the Freedom Caucus who insisted that a separate vote to restrict immigration be held before they would support the bill. Democratic opposition was largely due to the proposed changes to the attached Supplemental Nutrition Assistance Program that would impose work requirements. After the 2014 farm bill expired in September 2018, the 2018 farm bill was signed into law December 20, 2018.

History of farm bills: 1914 to 1981

1920s

Farmers demanded relief as the agricultural depression grew steadily worse in the middle 1920s, while the rest of the economy flourished.  Farmers had a powerful voice in Congress, and demanded federal subsidies, most notably the McNary–Haugen Farm Relief Bill. It was passed but vetoed by President Coolidge. Coolidge instead supported the alternative program of Commerce Secretary Herbert Hoover and Agriculture Secretary William M. Jardine to modernize farming, by bringing in more electricity, more efficient equipment, better seeds and breeds, more rural education, and better business practices. As president (1929-1933) Hoover set up the Federal Farm Board to promote efficiency and assist funding of cooperatives.

New Deal
In the 1920s most farmers were in the doldrums. When prices were high in 1919-20 many thousands borrowed money to buy out their neighbors. When prices fell, they had burdensome debts. Various relief proposals in the 1920s were discussed by Congress but not enacted into law.

When the Great Depression began in 1929, farm prices fell sharply, and exports fell as well.   In this time of agricultural crisis, farmers continued to produce as much as possible in the hopes that selling high quantities would make up for low prices, exacerbating the cyclical problem of surplus and low prices. At the same time, the urban areas faced high unemployment, so the entire nation was struggling economically.

The New Deal started three closely related programs after 1933. The Commodity Credit Corporation (CCC) made 12-month loans of cash against the farmers newly planted crops at a fixed price. If the market price rose higher, the farmer could pay off the loan by selling the crop for a profit. If the market price dropped below the fixed loan price, the farmer would give the harvested crop to the CCC. That would cancel the debt and leave the CC with a storage issue.  In effect CCC set a minimum price for crops such as corn, cotton and wheat. The second program was the Agricultural Adjustment Administration (AAA). It paid farmers to replace part of their cash crops with soil conservation grasses. This reduced the crop supply on the open market, and helped raise prices, while also conserving the soil from erosion. The CCC and AAA were permanent. The third program was the temporary Farm Credit Administration (FCA) which refinanced farm mortgages in 1934-1935, at lower interest rates.

Farm bills gave financial assistance to farmers who were struggling due to an excess crop supply creating low prices, and also to control and ensure an adequate food supply.  The benefit to farmers was supposed to outweigh the hurt to consumers who paid higher food prices.  Poor consumers, however, were beneficiaries of other New Deal programs.  On May 12, 1933 President Franklin D. Roosevelt signed the Agricultural Adjustment Act (AAA) of 1933 into law.  The AAA also included a nutrition program for consumers, the precursor to food stamps.

The AAA of 1933 was an abrupt change in policy and was designed as an emergency response to the low prices of commodity crops during the Great Depression. The AAA established a primary federal role in limiting the production of certain agricultural crops including wheat, corn, and cotton to reduce supply in order to increase prices.

President Roosevelt's New Deal legislation focusing on agriculture paid farmers to reduce the number of productive acres on their farms, ultimately limiting the supply of commodity crops on the market. The goal was to increase the price of farm commodities by reducing overall supply, while also providing relief to farmers who were deeply in debt. This was, however, a voluntary program, meaning farmers were not required to remove acres from production if they were not interested in government assistance. Those who participated tended to remove land from production that was already producing poorly, thereby reducing their yield as little as possible, and ultimately limiting the effectiveness of the Act. The AAA was short-lived as the Supreme Court deemed it unconstitutional on January 6, 1936. This was partially due to the processing tax that was used to finance payments to farmers and partially because the Court ruled government regulation of agricultural production within the states unconstitutional.

In 1938, Congress created a more permanent farm bill (the Agricultural Adjustment Act of 1938) with a built-in requirement to update it every five years. The Commodity Credit Corporation limited farm acreage, and purchased surplus crops to maintain high prices for farmers.

1940-1980

The Brannan Plan was a 1949 proposal of "compensatory payments" to farmers in response to the problem of large agricultural surpluses stemming from price supports for farmers. It was proposed by Charles Brannan, who served as the fourteenth United States Secretary of Agriculture from 1948 to 1953 as a member of President Harry S. Truman's cabinet. It was blocked by conservatives. The start of the Korean War in June 1950 made the surpluses a vital weapon and prices soared as surpluses were used up, making the proposal irrelevant.

Senator Hubert Humphrey, a leading Democrat, in 1953 convinced bipartisan majorities in Congress to use the Commodity Credit Corporation's store of surplus crops as part of American foreign aid. The idea was that needy nations could buy grain with local currencies rather than scarce dollars, thereby exporting American surpluses and become a major part of American foreign trade policy during the Cold War.

1981-1995
Farm programs under the Presidency of Ronald Reagan (1981-1989) were not very successful, even as the rest of the economy soared. Federal budget outlays reached $60 billion during his first term, but real farm income declined to its lowest level in postwar years. The price of farm land declined, causing a series of bankruptcies to farmers who had borrowed to buy neighboring acreage, as well as bankruptcies of local banks. Reagan advisor William A. Niskanen concludes: "One can hardly imagine a more disastrous policy outcome." The 1981 farm bill involved only small changes, and continued the policy of restricting supply rather than increasing demand. The 1984 budget proposal was designed to cut subsidies rather than reform the system, but Congress rejected it. Instead Congress continue the same policies in the 1985 farm bill, which Reagan reluctantly signed. The succeeding George H. W. Bush administration (1989-1993) continued the same policies. Niskanen says: "The U.S. farm program is still a scandal–raising the price of food to the hungry of the world, increasing the burden to U.S. taxpayers, and restricting the output of the world's most productive farmers."

1996 reforms
In 1996, the first major structural change was made to the farm bill when Congress decided farm incomes should be determined by free market forces and stopped subsidizing farmland and purchasing extra grain. Instead, the government began requiring farmers to enroll in a crop insurance program in order to receive farm payments. This led to years of the highest farm subsidies in American history. Direct payments also began in the late 1990s as a way to support struggling farmers, regardless of crop output. These payments allowed grain farmers to receive a government check every year based on yields and acreage of the farm as recorded the previous decade.

Farm bills since 1996
The first farm bill of the new millennium was the Farm Security Act of 2002, which was signed into law on May 13, 2002. Some of the bill’s major changes in comparison to the 1996 bill include an alteration of the farm payment program and the introduction of counter-cyclical farm income support. It also mandates the expansion of conservation land retirement programs and places an emphasis on environmental practices on the farm. Importantly, it restores the eligibility of legal immigrants to food stamps. Additionally, the 2002 farm bill relaxes the rules of the previous farm bill so that more borrowers may be eligible for Federal farm credit assistance, includes several commodities in the list of those that require labeling from their country of origin, and includes new provisions on the welfare of animals.

In 2008, the farm bill was passed as the Food, Conservation, and Energy Act of 2008. The bill included approximately $100 billion in annual spending for Department of Agriculture programs, around 80 percent of which was allocated for food stamps and other nutritional programs.

The 2008 Farm bill increased spending to $288Bn therefore causing controversy at the time by increasing the budget deficit.  It increased subsidies for biofuels which the World Bank has named as one of three most important contributors, along with high fuel prices and price speculation, to the 2007–2008 world food price crisis.

President George Bush had vetoed the 2008 bill due to its size and cost. However, the veto was overridden by Congress. In 2007, it was found that about 62 percent of farmers do not receive subsidies from the farm bill.

In 2012, while writing the new farm bill, known as the Agriculture Reform, Food and Jobs Act, Congress proposed many ways to cut down the overall cost of the bill, including stricter eligibility standards for food stamps and moving away from direct payments to farmers. However, food stamps and nutrition remained the largest portion of the bill's cost, amounting to a proposed $768.2 billion over ten years. The 2012 bill ultimately failed to pass in the House, which caused Congress to extend the 2008 bill until September 30, 2013. This was enacted as part of the American Taxpayer Relief Act of 2012, passed by Congress on January 1, 2013 and signed into law the next day by President Barack Obama. (Public Law No: 112-240)

Between the passage of the 2008 farm bill and the creation of the 2013 bill, the food stamp program changed its name to the Supplemental Nutrition Assistance Program (SNAP), and nearly doubled in size. The proposed 2013 bill would cut funding to SNAP by about $400 million a year, which amounts to half a percent of spending from previous years. Under an amendment introduced by Senators Dick Durbin (D-Ill.) and Tom Coburn (R-Okla.), it would also reduce crop insurance subsidies by 15 percent for the top 1 percent of U.S. wealthiest farmers, those with a gross annual income of more than $750,000. The new bill also proposed a new insurance program for dairy producers which would cut costs by eliminating other dairy subsidies and price supports.

The 2013 farm bill was approved in the Senate on June 10, 2013 but did not pass the House.

The 2014 Farm bill, known as the Agricultural Act of 2014, was passed by Congress and signed into law on February 7, 2014, 2 years late, as authority under its predecessor, the Food, Conservation, and Energy Act of 2008 had expired September 30, 2012.

The 2018 Farm bill, or Agriculture Improvement Act of 2018, was passed by Congress and signed into law on December 20, 2018. It primarily reauthorized many programs in the 2014 Farm Bill.

Non-farm bill agriculture legislation
 Federal Farm Loan Act of 1916
Frazier–Lemke Farm Bankruptcy Act of 1934
 Bankhead-Jones Farm Tenant Act of 1937
Farm Credit Act of 1971

Farm bills
According to a Congressional Research Service primer about the 2018 farm bill, eighteen farm bills have been enacted since the 1930s.

Agricultural Adjustment Act of 1933
Agricultural Adjustment Act of 1938
Agricultural Act of 1948
Agricultural Act of 1949
Agricultural Act of 1954
Agricultural Act of 1956
Food and Agriculture Act of 1965
 Agricultural Act of 1970
 Agriculture and Consumer Protection Act of 1973
 Food and Agriculture Act of 1977
 Agriculture and Food Act of 1981
 Food Security Act of 1985
 Food, Agriculture, Conservation, and Trade Act of 1990
 Federal Agriculture Improvement and Reform Act of 1996
 Farm Security and Rural Investment Act of 2002
 Food, Conservation, and Energy Act of 2008
 Agricultural Act of 2014
Agriculture Improvement Act of 2018

Proposed farm bills
 Federal Agriculture Reform and Risk Management Act of 2013 (H.R. 1947; 113th Congress) – failed passage in the House
 Agriculture Reform, Food, and Jobs Act of 2013 (S. 954; 113th Congress) – passed the Senate, failed in the House

See also
Alternative Agricultural Research and Commercialization Corporation
Farmers' suicides in the United States

References

Further reading

 Benedict, Murray R. "The Trend in American Agricultural Policy 1920-1949". Zeitschrift für die gesamte Staatswissenschaft / Journal of Institutional and Theoretical Economics (1950) 106#1: 97–122 online 
 Benedict, Murray R. Farm policies of the United States, 1790-1950: a study of their origins and development (1966) 546pp online; also another copy

 Bosso, Christopher. Framing the Farm Bill: Interests, Ideology, and Agricultural Act of 2014 (University Press of Kansas, 2017).

 Cochrane, Willard W. The Development of American Agriculture: A Historical Analysis (2nd ed. U of Minnesota Press, 1993) 512pp.
 Cochrane, Willard W. and Mary Ellen Ryan. American Farm Policy: 1948-1973 (U of Minnesota Press, 1976).
 CQ. Congress and the Nation (1965-2021), highly detailed coverage of each presidency since Truman; extensive coverage of agricultural policies. online free to borrow
 Coppess, Jonathan. The Fault Lines of Farm Policy: A Legislative and Political History of the Farm Bill (University of Nebraska Press, 2018). excerpt
 Coppess, Jonathan, et al. "The Agriculture Improvement Act of 2018: Initial Review." farmdoc daily (2018). online

 Gardner, Bruce L. "The federal government in farm commodity markets: Recent reform efforts in a long-term context." Agricultural History 70.2 (1996): 177-195. online

 Matusow, Allen J. Farm policies and politics in the Truman years (1967) online

 Mozaffarian, Dariush, Timothy Griffin, and Jerold Mande. "The 2018 Farm Bill—implications and opportunities for public health." JAMA 321.9 (2019): 835-836.
  Orden, David  and Carl Zulauf. "Political economy of the 2014 farm bill." American Journal of Agricultural Economics 97.5 (2015): 1298-1311. online 

 Sumner, Daniel A. "Farm subsidy tradition and modern agricultural realities." The 2007 Farm Bill and Beyond (2007): 29-33. online
 Taylor, Mykel R., et al. "Is it good to have options? The 2014 farm bill program decisions." Applied Economic Perspectives and Policy 39.4 (2017): 533-546.
 Zulauf, Carl  and David Orden, "The U.S. Agricultural Act of 2014: Overview and Analysis." (International Food Policy Research Institute discussion paper 01393, 2014) online
 Zulauf, Carl, and David Orden. "80 Years of Farm Bills—Evolutionary Reform." Choices (2016) 31#4  pp 1–7 online

Historiography
 Zobbe, Henrik. "On the foundation of agricultural policy research in the United States." (Dept. of Agricultural Economics Staff Paper 02-08, Purdue University, 2002) online.

Primary sources
 Rasmussen, Wayne D., ed. Agriculture in the United States: A Documentary History (4 vol, Random House, 1975) 3661pp.  vol 4 online

External links
 2018FarmBill.pdf

United States federal agriculture legislation
Agricultural subsidies
Agricultural economics